João Maria Ferreira do Amaral, OTS, CC (Lisbon, São Julião, 14 June 1876 - Lisbon, 11 March 1931) was a Portuguese soldier.

Ancestry
He was a natural son of Francisco Joaquim Ferreira do Amaral by Augusta Frederica Smith Chaves.

Life
He was a Colonel of Infantry of the Portuguese Army, Commander of the Polícia de Segurança Pública, Officer of the Order of the Tower and Sword with Palm, Commander of the Order of Christ with Palm and Commander of the Legion of Honour, Croix de Guerre, etc., who fought in World War I.

Marriage and issue
He married Maria Emília Carolina Tavares de Almeida Arez (Nova Goa, Goa, India, 3 May 1872 - 1923), daughter of José Joaquim Fernandes Arez, Engineer, and wife Dionísia Maria Tavares de Almeida, and widow of Mateus José Lapa Valente do Couto (Oeiras, 1861–1904), married Pangim, 12 February 1887, with one son, and had an only daughter: 
 Lia Arez Ferreira do Amaral (Lisbon, Santa Isabel, 20 December 1914 - Oeiras, 1999), Licentiate in Historico-Philosophical Sciences, married Joaquim Cândido da Fonseca (1912 - Lisbon, 1977), Licentiate in Historico-Philosophical Sciences, former Vice-Dean of Oeiras High School, son of Manuel Cândido da Fonseca and wife Maria do Rosário Pires, and had female issue

References and notes

 GeneAll.net - João Maria Ferreira do Amaral at www.geneall.net João Maria Ferreira do Amaral

Sources
 Anuário da Nobreza de Portugal, III, 1985, Tomo II, pp. 758–761

1876 births
1931 deaths
20th-century Portuguese engineers
People from Lisbon
Recipients of the Order of the Tower and Sword